Makefield Meeting, also known as Makefield Monthly Meeting; Meeting House at Dolington,  is a historic Quaker meeting house complex located in Upper Makefield Township, Bucks County, Pennsylvania.  It was built in 1752 and the second story was added in 1764.  It is a two-story, six bay, stuccoed stone structure with a gable roof. The building was renovated in 1851.  The complex also includes the -story, stuccoed stone schoolmaster's house built in 1787, and a horse shed built about 1800.

It was added to the National Register of Historic Places in 1974. Weekly worship services are held at 10 a.m. on Sundays.

References

External links
Makefield Friends Meeting

Quaker meeting houses in Pennsylvania
Churches on the National Register of Historic Places in Pennsylvania
Churches completed in 1752
Churches in Bucks County, Pennsylvania
18th-century Quaker meeting houses
National Register of Historic Places in Bucks County, Pennsylvania